V S R Swamy is an Indian cinematographer.

Filmography

Camera and Electrical Department
 Farz (1967) (camera operator)  ... aka Duty

Awards
Nandi Award for Best Cinematographer - Viswanatha Nayakudu (1987)

References

External links
 

Telugu film directors
Telugu film cinematographers
Film directors from Andhra Pradesh
Living people
Year of birth missing (living people)
Place of birth missing (living people)
People from Krishna district
20th-century Indian film directors
21st-century Indian film directors
Cinematographers from Andhra Pradesh